a TEN Talk (originally 10Talk) is a short presentation on a topic of the speaker's choosing given at a BarCamp type conference. It derives from a TED Talk and originated at the 2012 RefreshCache v4 developer conference  (now defunct) in Gilbert, Arizona during the open floor demo time with a description of "Fast paced 10 minute presentations by the you and the other leaders among us."  Since the term was still somewhat new at the time, a "What is a Ten-Talk?" page was created on the RefreshCache site with the following abbreviated description so  potential Ten-Talk presenters would know exactly what was expected of them:
 
 A Ten-Talk is a fast-paced, ten minute POLISHED presentation on an interesting topic that you think will appeal to the Church IT / Web Developer audiences.
 
 Here are some examples of Ten-Talk topics:
 (1) Have you implemented something at your church that has been a radical success or epic failure? We can learn from either of these!
 (2) Do you have an inspirational message that can lead others to action?  Even better if you can share how this message inspired you to action and then show us what you did.
 (3) Have you spent time researching and understanding something in the world of ministry software or Church IT? Maybe you are an expert in [redacted]. Present this to the Church IT Network /RefreshCache community and share what you know. Your research may help another church find the solution to a problem they are facing, or save them the trouble of doing all the research you just did by realizing it won't work for them.

It was later adopted at the national Church IT Round Table conference held in February 2013 in Phoenix, Arizona when the two events began to intermingle and used again in 2014  at the Peoria, Illinois event where it was re-described as "10Talks (or TEN-Talks) are 10 minute, fast paced talks on a topic. These are perfect sessions for raising awareness about a topic, tool, or idea that you think your peers should know."

Its use outside of CITRT conferences is thought to begin with the WLAN professionals summit in February 2014.

References

Presentation